Yuval Levin (born April 6, 1977) is a conservative American political analyst, academic, and journalist. He is the founding editor of National Affairs (2009–present), the director of Social, Cultural, and Constitutional Studies at the American Enterprise Institute (2019–present), and a contributing editor of National Review (2007–present) and co-founder and a senior editor of The New Atlantis (2003–present).

Levin was the vice president and Hertog Fellow of Ethics and Public Policy Center (2007–19), executive director of the President's Council on Bioethics (2001–04), Special Assistant to the President for Domestic Policy (2004–07), and contributing editor to The Weekly Standard (95–2018). Prior to that he served as a congressional staffer at the member, committee, and leadership levels.

Levin's essays and articles have appeared in numerous publications, among them, The New York Times, The Washington Post, The Wall Street Journal,  and Commentary. He is the author of five books on public policy and political theory, including The Fractured Republic (Basic Books, 2016) and A Time to Build (Basic Books, 2020).

Early life and education
Levin was born in Haifa, Israel, and moved to the United States with his family at the age of eight. He earned a bachelor's degree in political science at American University, and earned a PhD from the Committee on Social Thought at the University of Chicago.

Career
Levin writes about political theory, science, technology, and public policy. On the relationship between political theory and public policy, Levin has observed:

For me, these things are very deeply connected. I think politics really is rooted in political philosophy, is much better understood when it's understood in light of political philosophy. And that a lot of the policy debates we have make much more sense if you see that people are arguing about two ways of understanding what the human person is, what human society is, and especially what the liberal society is. The left and right in our country are both liberal, they both believe in the free society, but they mean something very different by that.

Conservatism, Levin has notably said, "understands society not as just individuals and government, but thinks of it in terms of everything that happens in between. That huge space between the individual and the state is where society actually is. And that's where families are, it's where communities are, it's where the market economy is."

In 2014, Levin co-edited, with Ramesh Ponnuru, Room to Grow: Conservative Reforms for a Limited Government and a Thriving Middle Class, a reform conservative manifesto and policy agenda. The book was widely praised, with New York Times columnist David Brooks describing it as a "policy-laden manifesto... which is the most coherent and compelling policy agenda the American right has produced this century."

Ross Douthat called Levin a leader of the "reform conservative" movement, and Levin was prominently featured in a 2014 New York Times Magazine cover story about the conservative intellectuals who comprise it. The Times''' Sam Tanenhaus wrote that Levin was one of a group of young conservative Republicans who had "become the leaders of a small band of reform conservatives, sometimes called reformicons, who believe the health of the G.O.P. hinges on jettisoning its age-old doctrine — orgiastic tax-cutting, the slashing of government programs, the championing of Wall Street — and using an altogether different vocabulary, backed by specific proposals, that will reconnect the party to middle-class and low-income voters."

Levin was called "probably the most influential conservative intellectual of the Obama era" by Jonathan Chait of New York Magazine'', further noting that he had been recently recognized as such when granted the prestigious $250,000 Bradley Prize.

Works

References

External links
 Levin's biography on the National Affairs website
 Levin's National Review archive
 Levin's Weekly Standard archive
 Partially comprehensive publications list at The New Atlantis
 Discussion regarding The Fractured Republic with Russ Roberts on EconTalk
 

1977 births
21st-century American journalists
21st-century American writers
American magazine editors
American political scientists
American political philosophers
American University School of Public Affairs alumni
Israeli emigrants to the United States
Jewish American academics
Jewish American writers
Living people
Writers from Haifa
University of Chicago alumni
The Weekly Standard people
Ethics and Public Policy Center
21st-century American Jews
American Enterprise Institute